The 1980 United States presidential election in North Carolina took place on November 4, 1980, as part of the 1980 United States presidential election. Voters chose 13 representatives, or electors to the Electoral College, who voted for president and vice president.

North Carolina barely voted for the Republican nominee, Governor Ronald Reagan, over the Democratic nominee, President Jimmy Carter in a close battle. Independent John B. Anderson, won 2% of the vote from Reagan and Carter in the state. The final numbers were 49.30% for Reagan to 47.18% for Carter and 2.85% for Anderson. , this is the last election in which the following counties have voted for a Democratic presidential candidate: Cleveland, Currituck, Harnett, Lee, Person and Union.

After Jimmy Carter won the southern state in 1976, and following Jimmy Carter's inferior performance, the state was returned to the Republican column in 1980, and would trend even more Republican in the next election and vote Republican in every election after, except in 2008 when it narrowly voted for Barack Obama over John McCain. Since then it has become a Republican-leaning swing state.

Results

Results by county

References

North Carolina
1980
1980 North Carolina elections